A200 may refer to:

 A200 motorway (Netherlands)
 Mercedes-Benz A-Class
 A200 road, a route in south east London from London Bridge to Greenwich
 Aero A.200, a sportsplane of Czechoslovakia from 1934
 A200 Platform, see Sony Ericsson
 A-200 a defunct brand of lice killing shampoo
 Toshiba Satellite A200, a laptop produced by Toshiba
 Konica Minolta Dimage A200, a digital bridge camera
 DSLR-A200 aka Sony α200, a digital SLR with A-mount in the Sony Alpha camera system